The Black Mountain boulder frog (Cophixalus saxatilis), also known as the rock haunting frog or the Black Mountain rainforest frog, is a species of frog in the family Microhylidae.

It is endemic to Australia, and its populations are now restricted to the Kalkajaka National Park, Australia.

Its original habitats were subtropical or tropical moist lowland forests, rocky areas, and caves, now severely reduced to the "Black Mountains" 25 km south-west of Cooktown, Queensland.

Description

The Queensland Environmental Protection Agency has described and summarized some of the distinctive features of this frog as follows:

See also

 Kalkajaka National Park

References

Cophixalus
Amphibians of Queensland
Taxonomy articles created by Polbot
Amphibians described in 1977
Frogs of Australia